Howard Edward Crosby (26 November 1933 – 12 December 2003) was a Canadian politician and lawyer. Crosby served as a Progressive Conservative party member of the House of Commons of Canada. He was born in Halifax, Nova Scotia and became a lawyer and barrister by career.

He represented the Nova Scotia riding of Halifax—East Hants, subsequently Halifax West since a by-election win there on 16 October 1978. He was re-elected in the 1979, 1980, 1984 and 1988 federal elections.

He served in the latter part of the 30th Canadian Parliament and for four successive full terms from the 31st through 34th Canadian Parliaments. He left national politics in 1993 and did not campaign in that year's federal election.

Electoral record

External links
 

1933 births
2003 deaths
Members of the House of Commons of Canada from Nova Scotia
Progressive Conservative Party of Canada MPs